Alvard is a village in Razakan Rural District, in the Central District of Shahriar County, Tehran Province, Iran. At the 2006 census, its population was 1,434, in 355 families.

References 

Populated places in Shahriar County